Baronett may refer to:

 Baronet (variant spelling: baronett), an hereditary title of lower rank than baron
 Baronette (variant spelling: baronett), a type of satin
 Baronett Peak, Yellowstone Park, USA; surveyed as part of the Hayden Geological Survey of 1871
 Baronett Bridge, the first bridge across the Yellowstone River, Yellowstone Park, USA; destroyed during the incident of Nez Perce in Yellowstone Park

See also

 
 Baron (disambiguation)